Carlos Grethe (25 September 1864, Montevideo, Uruguay – 2 February 1913, Nieuwpoort, Belgium) was a Uruguayan-born German painter and academician.

Life 
Grethe was born in Montevideo, Uruguay, but lived in Hamburg from the age of five. He interrupted his studies for almost a year to undertake a sea voyage to Mexico in 1888 and 1889. He followed up by teaching at the Karlsruhe Kunstgewerbeschule and the academy there, and thereafter, in 1899, at the Kgl. Academy of Fine Arts in Stuttgart until his premature death. From 1894, Grethe was a member of the Munich Secession, and was also involved in the founding of the Karlsruher Künstlerbundes in 1896, the Stuttgarter Künstlerbundes, (the State Academy of Fine Arts in Stuttgart) in 1901, and the Verein Württembergischer Kunstfreunde. By the turn of the century Grethe had become prominent in representations of man and the sea, as well as of coasts and ports. His artistic style developed from a commitment to modern realism at the beginning of his career to a rather more impressionistic style in his later works.

References

Literature 
 Hamburger Ansichten – Maler sehen die Stadt. Hamburger Kunsthalle, Wienand Verlag, S. 186
 Ingrun Stocke: Carlos Grethe: der Maler des Meeres; 1864 - 1913; Leben und Werk. Kromsdorf: VDG Weimar 2008 

1864 births
1913 deaths
People from Montevideo
19th-century German artists
20th-century German artists
Uruguayan emigrants to Germany